The 2007 FIVB Volleyball Men's Junior World Championship was held from 7 to 15 July 2007 in Rabat and Casablanca, Morocco. It was the last tournament to feature 12 teams.

Competing nations
Drawing of lots to determine Pools composition was held on 7 June 2007.

First round
All times are Morocco's Standard Time WET (UTC+00:00).

Pool A

|}

|}

Pool B

|}

|}

Final round

9th–12th places bracket

Classification 9th-12th

|}

12th-place match

|}

9th-place match

|}

5th-8th places bracket

Classification 5th-8th

|}

7th-place match

|}

5th-place match

|}

1st-4th places bracket

Semifinals

|}

Bronze-medal match

|}

Final

|}

Final standing

Individual awards
MVP:  Deivid Costa
Best Scorer:  Matteo Martino
Best Spiker:  Matteo Martino
Best Blocker:  Deivid Costa
Best Server:  Maxim Mikhaylov
Best Digger:  Roman Martynyuk
Best Setter:  Davide Saitta
Best Receiver:  Matteo Martino

References

External links

FIVB Volleyball Men's U21 World Championship
International volleyball competitions hosted by Morocco
W
2007 in Moroccan sport